The Massachusetts House of Representatives currently has 11 committees.

2017–2019 Standing Committees

See also
 2019–2020 Massachusetts legislature
 2021–2022 Massachusetts legislature
 List of Massachusetts General Courts

References

House of Representatives